Alexakis Vlachopoulos, also known as Alexis Vlachopoulos, (Nicopolis near Preveza, 1780 – Athens, 1865) was an armatolos, fighter in the Greek Revolution for Independence of 1821, congressman, and Minister of Defense. He was, also, a member of the Filiki Eteria.

Biography
He was born in Nicopolis near Preveza, northwestern Greece, in 1780. Many members of his family were Armatoloi, Christian Greek irregular soldiers, in the area of Karpenisi, in central Greece. When he was young he went to Ali Pasha’s court, where he learnt to use the guns, like many other Greek fighters, as for example Odysseas Androutsos, Markos Botsaris, and others.

During the pre-revolutionary period he fought together with his brother Konstantinos, also an armatolos. Later, because of Ali Pasha's persecution, he and his brother were forced to flee to Corfu, where, the two brothers joined the Greek battalions of the British Army. In 1819 he was initiated, along with his brothers, Konstantinos and Dimitrios, into the Filiki Eteria (Society of Friends), a secret organization whose purpose was to overthrow the Ottoman rule of Greece and establish an independent Greek state.

He fought in many battles of the Greek Revolution of 1821, and while leading his army group he liberated the town of Agrinio, then called Vrachori.
In this battle he took some Turks as hostages, which he later exchanged with members of his family which were imprisoned by the Turks in Preveza.
After the Greek Independence he became a politician. He served as a Minister of Defense in the government of Ioannis Kapodistrias, and also under the first king of Greece, Otto. During the 3 September Revolution of 1843 he was imprisoned. He served as an adjutant to king George I of Hellenes.

He was married to a woman named Anastasia, with whom he had at least three children. Two girls, Euphrosyne and Cassandra, and a son named Parnassos. Cassandra married Nikolaos Miaoulis, Andreas's grandson, while Euphrosyne married Panagi Valsamakis from Kefalonia. The daughter of Euphrosyne, Maria, married the Corfiot painter Aimilios Prosalentis, son of Spyridon Prosalentis.

He died in Athens in 1865.

References

Bibliography
 Encyclopedia Eleftheroudakis (in Greek), Athens, 1960.
 Megali Elliniki Encyclopedia (Great Greek Encyclopedia) (in Greek), Athens, 1932.
 Papyros-Larousse Britanicca (in Greek), Athens, 2007.
 Dionysios Kokkinos, He Elleniki Epanastasis (The Greek Revolution) (in Greek), 6th Ed., Melissa Eds., Athens, 1974.

External links
 Heroes of 1821: Alexakis Vlachopoulos

1780 births
1865 deaths
Greek people of the Greek War of Independence
People from Preveza
Members of the Filiki Eteria